Tomasz Kos (born 4 April 1974) is a retired Polish footballer who spent most of his career playing for the German clubs 1. FC Nürnberg and FC Erzgebirge Aue.

References

External links
 
 

Living people
1974 births
People from Koło County
Sportspeople from Greater Poland Voivodeship
Association football defenders
Polish footballers
Polish expatriate footballers
ŁKS Łódź players
1. FC Nürnberg players
FC Erzgebirge Aue players
FC Gütersloh 2000 players
Ekstraklasa players
Bundesliga players
2. Bundesliga players
3. Liga players
Expatriate footballers in Germany
Poland international footballers
Sokół Pniewy players